Buildings and structures on the University of Portland campus include:

 Alumni House
 Bauccio Commons
 Beauchamp Recreation & Wellness Center
 Buckley Center
 Buckley Center Auditorium
 Chapel of Christ the Teacher
 Chiles Center
 Christie Hall
 Clark Library
 Clive Charles Soccer Complex
 Corrado Hall
 Fields Hall and Schoenfeldt Hall
 Franz Hall
 Haggerty Hall
 Howard Hall
 Joe Etzel Field
 KDUP
 Kenna Hall
 Louisiana-Pacific Tennis Center
 Lund Family Hall
 Mago Hunt Center
 Mehling Hall
 Orrico Hall
 Physical Plant
 Pilot House
 Public Safety
 Romanaggi Hall
 Shiley Hall
 Shipstad Hall
 St. Mary's Student Center
 Swindells Hall
 Tyson Hall
 Villa Maria Hall
 Waldschmidt Hall

See also

 List of Marylhurst University buildings
 List of Portland State University buildings
 List of Reed College buildings
 List of University of Oregon buildings
 List of Willamette University buildings

University of Portland
Portland
University of Portland buildings
University of Portland buildings
University of Portland campus